Alan Bennett (born 9 May 1934) is an English actor, author, playwright and screenwriter. Over his entertainment career he has received numerous awards and honours including two BAFTA Awards, four Laurence Olivier Awards, and two Tony Awards. He also earned an Academy Award nomination for his film The Madness of King George (1994). In 2005 he received the Society of London Theatre Special Award.

Bennett was born in Leeds and attended Oxford University, where he studied history and performed with the Oxford Revue. He stayed to teach and research medieval history at the university for several years. His collaboration as writer and performer with Dudley Moore, Jonathan Miller and Peter Cook in the satirical revue Beyond the Fringe at the 1960 Edinburgh Festival brought him instant fame and later a Special Tony Award. He gave up academia, and turned to writing full time, his first stage play, Forty Years On, being produced in 1968. He also became known for writing dramatic monologues Talking Heads which ran in 1988, and 1999 on BBC1 earning a British Academy Television Award.

Bennett gained acclaim with his various plays at the Royal National Theatre. He received his the Laurence Olivier Award for Best Comedy Play for Single Spies in 1990. He then made his breakthrough with the play The Madness of George III in 1992. For his play he received a nomination for the Laurence Olivier Award for Best New Play. The following year he staged a theatrical production of the BBC series Talking Heads in 1992. He continued receiving acclaim for his plays The Lady in the Van in 1999, The History Boys in 2004, and The Habit of Art in 2009. He won his second Tony Award for Best Play for The History Boys in 2005. The following plays were later adapted into films, The Madness of King George (1994), for which he received an Academy Award for Best Adapted Screenplay nomination, The History Boys (2005), and The Lady in the Van (2015).

Bennett is also known for a wide variety of audio books, including his readings of Alice's Adventures in Wonderland and Winnie-the-Pooh.

Early life
Bennett was born on 9 May 1934 in Armley, Leeds, West Riding of Yorkshire. The younger son of a Co-op butcher, Walter, and his wife, Lilian Mary (née Peel), Bennett attended Christ Church, Upper Armley, Church of England School (in the same class as Barbara Taylor Bradford), and then Leeds Modern School (now Lawnswood School). He has an older brother, Gordon, who is three years his senior.

Bennett learned Russian at the Joint Services School for Linguists during his national service before applying for a scholarship at Oxford University. He was accepted by Exeter College, Oxford, from which he graduated with a first-class degree in history. While at Oxford he performed comedy with a number of eventually successful actors in the Oxford Revue. He remained at the university for several years, where he served as a junior lecturer of Medieval History at Magdalen College, before deciding, in 1960, that he was not suited to being an academic.

Career

Early career 
In August 1960, Bennett – along with Dudley Moore, Jonathan Miller and Peter Cook – gained fame after an appearance at the Edinburgh Festival in the satirical revue Beyond the Fringe, with the show continuing in London and New York. He also appeared in My Father Knew Lloyd George. His television comedy sketch series On the Margin (1966) was erased; the BBC re-used expensive videotape rather than keep it in the archives. However, in 2014 it was announced that audio copies of the entire series had been found.

Bennett's first stage play Forty Years On, directed by Patrick Garland, was produced in 1968. Many television, stage and radio plays followed, with screenplays, short stories, novellas, a large body of non-fictional prose, and broadcasting and many appearances as an actor.

Despite a long history with both the National Theatre and the BBC, Bennett never writes on commission, saying "I don't work on commission, I just do it on spec. If people don't want it then it's too bad."

His many works for television include his first play for the medium, A Day Out in 1972,  A Little Outing in 1977, Intensive Care in 1982, An Englishman Abroad in 1983, and A Question of Attribution in 1991. But perhaps his most famous screen work is the 1988 Talking Heads series of monologues for television which were later performed at the Comedy Theatre in London in 1992. A second set of six Talking Heads followed a decade later.

1980s 
Bennett wrote the play Enjoy in 1980. It barely scraped a run of seven weeks at the Vaudeville Theatre, in spite of the stellar cast of Joan Plowright, Colin Blakely, Susan Littler, Philip Sayer, Liz Smith (who replaced Joan Hickson during rehearsals) and, in his first West End role, Marc Sinden. It was directed by Ronald Eyre. A new production of Enjoy attracted very favourable notices during its 2008 UK tour and moved to the West End of London in January 2009. The West End show took over £1 million in advance ticket sales and even extended the run to cope with demand. The production starred Alison Steadman, David Troughton, Richard Glaves, Carol Macready and Josie Walker.

1990s 
Bennett wrote The Lady in the Van based on his experiences with an eccentric woman called Miss Shepherd, who lived on Bennett's driveway in a series of dilapidated vans for more than fifteen years. It was first published in 1989 as an essay in the London Review of Books. In 1990 he published it in book form.  In 1999 he adapted it into a stage play, which starred Maggie Smith and was directed by Nicholas Hytner. The stage play includes two characters named Alan Bennett. On 21 February 2009 it was broadcast as a radio play on BBC Radio 4, with Maggie Smith reprising her role and Alan Bennett playing himself. He adapted the story again for a 2015 film, with Maggie Smith reprising her role again, and Nicholas Hytner directing again. In the film Alex Jennings plays the two versions of Bennett, although Alan Bennett appears in a cameo at the very end of the film.

Bennett adapted his 1991 play The Madness of George III for the cinema. Entitled The Madness of King George (1994), the film received four Academy Award nominations: for Bennett's writing and the performances of Nigel Hawthorne and Helen Mirren. It won the award for best art direction.

21st century 

Bennett's critically acclaimed The History Boys won three Laurence Olivier Awards in 2005, for Best New Play, Best Actor (Richard Griffiths), and Best Direction (Nicholas Hytner), having previously won Critics' Circle Theatre Awards and Evening Standard Awards for Best Actor and Best Play. Bennett also received the Laurence Olivier Award for Outstanding Contribution to British Theatre. The History Boys won six Tony Awards on Broadway, including best play, best performance by a leading actor in a play (Richard Griffiths), best performance by a featured actress in a play (Frances de la Tour) and best direction of a play (Nicholas Hytner). A film version of The History Boys was released in the UK in October 2006. In his 2005 prose collection Untold Stories, Bennett wrote of the mental illness that his mother and other family members suffered.

At the National Theatre in late 2009 Nicholas Hytner directed Bennett's play The Habit of Art, about the relationship between the poet W. H. Auden and the composer Benjamin Britten.

Bennett's play People opened at the National Theatre in October 2012. In December that year, Cocktail Sticks, an autobiographical play by Bennett, premièred at the National Theatre as part of a double bill with the monologue Hymn. The production was directed by Bennett's long-term collaborator Nicholas Hytner. It was well-received, and transferred to the Duchess Theatre in the West End of London, being subsequently adapted for radio broadcast by BBC Radio 4.

In July 2018, Allelujah!, a comic drama by Bennett about a National Health Service hospital threatened with closure, opened at London's Bridge Theatre to critical acclaim.

Personal life

Bennett lived for 40 years on Gloucester Crescent in Camden Town in London but now lives a few minutes' walk away at Primrose Hill with his partner Rupert Thomas, the former editor of The World of Interiors magazine. Bennett also had a long-term relationship with his former housekeeper, Anne Davies, until her death in 2009.

Bennett is an agnostic. He was raised Anglican and gradually "left it [the Church] over the years".

In 1988, Bennett declined the award of Commander of the Order of the British Empire (CBE) and in 1996 declined a knighthood.

In September 2005, Bennett revealed that, in 1997, he had undergone treatment for colorectal cancer, and described the illness as a "bore". His chances of survival were given as being "much less" than 50% and surgeons had told him they removed a "rock-bun" sized tumour. He began Untold Stories (published 2005) thinking it would be published posthumously, but his cancer went into remission.

In the autobiographical sketches which form a large part of the book Bennett wrote openly for the first time about his bisexuality. Previously Bennett had referred to questions about his sexuality as like asking a man who has just crawled across the Sahara desert to choose between Perrier or Malvern mineral water.

In October 2008, Bennett announced that he was donating his entire archive of working papers, unpublished manuscripts, diaries and books to the Bodleian Library, stating that it was a gesture of thanks repaying a debt he felt he owed to the British welfare state that had given him educational opportunities which his humble family background would otherwise never have afforded.

In September 2015, Bennett endorsed Jeremy Corbyn's campaign in the Labour Party leadership election. The following month, after Corbyn's election victory, Bennett said: "I approve of him. If only because it brings Labour back to what they ought to be thinking about."

Following the death of Jonathan Miller in 2019, he became the only surviving member of the original Beyond the Fringe quartet which had also included Peter Cook and Dudley Moore.

Work
 
Selected credits

Film

Theatre

Bibliography

Awards and honours
 

Bennett was made an Honorary Fellow of Exeter College, Oxford, in 1987. He was also awarded a D.Litt by the University of Leeds in 1990 and an honorary doctorate from Kingston University in 1996. In 1998 he refused an honorary doctorate from Oxford University, in protest at its acceptance of funding for a chair from press baron Rupert Murdoch. He also declined a CBE in 1988 and a knighthood in 1996. He has stated that, although he is not a republican, he would never wish to be knighted, saying it would be a bit like having to wear a suit for the rest of his life.

In December 2011 Bennett returned to Lawnswood School, nearly 60 years after he left, to unveil the renamed Alan Bennett Library. He said he "loosely" based The History Boys on his experiences at the school and his admission to Oxford. Lawnswood School dedicated its library to the writer after he emerged as a vocal campaigner against public library cuts. Plans to shut local libraries were "wrong and very short-sighted", Bennett said, adding: "We're impoverishing young people."

In popular culture

 In the film for television Not Only But Always, about the careers of Peter Cook and Dudley Moore, Bennett is portrayed by Alan Cox.
 Along with the other members of Beyond the Fringe, Bennett is portrayed in the play Pete and Dud: Come Again, by Chris Bartlett and Nick Awde.
 Bennett voices himself in the episode "Brian's Play" of the animated series Family Guy.
 Bennett was portrayed by Harry Enfield as Stalin, in an episode of "Talking Heads of State", in BBC Two's 2014 satirical Harry and Paul's Story of the Twos.
 Bennett is portrayed by Reece Dinsdale in a 2014 production of Untold Stories at the West Yorkshire Playhouse.
 Bennett is portrayed by British actor Alex Jennings in the 2015 comedy-drama film The Lady in the Van. He appears as himself briefly at the end of the film.
 In the season 2 episode "Mystery Man" of the Netflix show The Crown, Bennett is portrayed by British actor Seb Carrington.
 In Stewart Lee’s 2022 comedy special “Tornado”, Bennett appears as himself at the very end. In the appearance, Bennett states that Erving Goffman would have enjoyed the special. This refers to a review of Lee’s comedy that Bennett wrote for The London Review of Books in 2017 and acts as a callback to a previous joke in the special.

References

Further reading
 Peter Wolfe, Understanding Alan Bennett, University of South Carolina Press, 
 
 Joseph H. O'Mealy, Alan Bennett: A Critical Introduction, Routledge, 2001, 
 Kara McKechnie, Alan Bennett, The Television Series, Manchester University Press, 2007. 
 Robert Hewison, Footlights – A Hundred Years of Cambridge Comedy, Methuen, 1983
 Roger Wilmut, From Fringe to Flying Circus – Celebrating a Unique Generation of Comedy 1960–1980, Eyre Methuen, 1980,

External links

  French website dedicated to Alan Bennett
 Profile at the British Council
 Interview BBC archive 6 December 2009 with Mark Lawson. (Video, 1 hr)
 BBC Interview Radio 4 Front Row archive. (Audio, 1 hr)
 Portraits at the National Portrait Gallery (3 pages)
 
 
 "Curtain re-opens on Bennett play" BBC News, 29 January 2009 – Video interview with Alan Bennett
 
 Guardian profile "Birthday boy" 7 May 2009 by Blake Morrison.
 Alan Bennett at Macmillan Books
 Alan Bennett's Talking Heads BBC Radio 4 "The Reunion". (Audio, 42 min)
 Archival material at 

1934 births
Living people
Military personnel from Leeds
20th-century British military personnel
20th-century English dramatists and playwrights
20th-century English male actors
21st-century English dramatists and playwrights
21st-century English male actors
20th-century English LGBT people
21st-century English LGBT people
Alumni of Exeter College, Oxford
Audiobook narrators
BAFTA winners (people)
Bisexual male actors
British Book Award winners
British male television writers
British monarchists
English agnostics
English diarists
English male dramatists and playwrights
English male film actors
English male radio actors
English male screenwriters
English male stage actors
English male television actors
English male voice actors
English radio personalities
English satirists
English television writers
Fellows of Exeter College, Oxford
English LGBT dramatists and playwrights
English LGBT screenwriters
Bisexual dramatists and playwrights
Bisexual screenwriters
Male actors from Leeds
Laurence Olivier Award winners
People educated at Leeds Modern School
People from Armley
Tony Award winners
Special Tony Award recipients
Writers from Leeds